The AN/FPS-35 frequency diversity radar was a long range search radar used in the early 1960s. It was one of the largest air defense radars ever produced, with its antenna and supporting structure mounted on one of the largest rolling-element bearings in the world (with a ball pitch of 12 ft 7 inches in diameter.).

Overview 
Sperry Corporation built 12 long range radars (picking up objects 200 miles away) in the 1960s to succeed existing Semi Automatic Ground Environment (SAGE) to provide enhanced electronic countermeasures (ECM). The systems operated at 420 to 450 MHz.

The prototype was developed at the Thomasville Aircraft Control and Warning Station in Thomasville, Alabama.

The  enclosed radar towers that supported all 12 of the FPS-35 antennas were prominent landmarks. All these radar towers were of the same basic design with 10 made primarily from concrete and two based on a steel frame structure (Baker and Finley).  Only the  radar tower at Baker has been demolished.

The 23 radar towers used by the AN/FPS-24 and the AN/FPS-35 radar sets were of similar designs (concrete or steel frame) and were designed under the direction of the Rome Air Development Center (RADC). The radar tower at Thomasville has an RADC plaque next to the one from the Sperry Corporation. Only the AN/FPS-35 tower at Baker included a radome to protect the antenna.

Montauk tower 

All of the radars have been dismantled except for the one at Camp Hero State Park on the eastern tip of Long Island in Montauk, New York. It was the last to operate (January 1981) and the radar tower is the only one that still has an antenna on the roof and contains some of the radar set equipment and cabinets. The antenna was repaired with parts from the Sault Ste. Marie station after it closed in October 1979. The Montauk antenna is very corroded and can not be rotated.

The structure was listed on the National Register of Historic Places in 2002. Fishermen on the Atlantic Ocean and Block Island Sound lobbied to save it since the massive radar tower was a better daytime landmark than the Montauk Point Lighthouse.

The Montauk radar has worked its way into an urban legend that it was used in time travel experiments called the Montauk Project.

List of towers 
 AL Thomasville 
 CA Boron 
 MI Sault Ste. Marie 
 MI Selfridge 
 NV Fallon 
 NY Montauk 
 ND Finley    (steel tower, present)
 ND Fortuna 
 PA Benton 
 VA Manassas 
 WI Antigo 
 OR Baker    (steel tower, demolished)

References

External links

FAS.ORG list of radars
Radomes.org Article on the Radar

East Hampton (town), New York
Ground radars
Military radars of the United States
Radars of the United States Air Force
Military facilities on the National Register of Historic Places in New York (state)
Buildings and structures in Suffolk County, New York
National Register of Historic Places in Suffolk County, New York
Military equipment introduced in the 1960s